Marc Fernández Gracia (born 24 April 1990) is a Spanish professional footballer who plays as a right winger for Gimnàstic de Tarragona.

Club career

Spain
Born in Corbera de Llobregat, Barcelona, Catalonia, Fernández made his senior debut in 2009–10, with Tercera División club CE Europa on loan from CE Sabadell FC. After playing regularly for the latter during the following season and scoring five goals, including one against SD Eibar during the promotion play-offs (1–1 away draw, qualification on the away goals rule), he signed with Segunda División team FC Cartagena unilaterally on 8 July 2011 when his contract had recently been renewed; eventually, the Liga de Fútbol Profesional sided with the player.

Fernández joined RCD Mallorca on 10 July 2012, being initially assigned to the reserves who competed in the third level. He made his La Liga debut for the first team on 18 August, coming on as a 74th-minute substitute for Emilio Nsue in a 2–1 home victory over RCD Espanyol.

On 14 January 2014, after an aborted transfer to Espanyol, Fernández moved abroad and signed for Bnei Sakhnin F.C. in the Israeli Premier League. He returned to the former club in the summer, however, joining its B side.

Fernández continued competing in the Spanish third tier the following years, representing in quick succession Sabadell, UE Llagostera and UCAM Murcia CF.

Greece
On 31 May 2018, the 28-year-old Fernández agreed to a two-year deal at Super League Greece's Asteras Tripolis FC. He finished his first year with eight goals in all competitions. 

Fernández scored his first goal for the 2019–20 campaign on 15 September 2019, in a 2–1 away loss against Xanthi FC. Six days later, his brace helped the hosts to a 2–1 home defeat of Atromitos FC.

On 8 September 2020, Fernández joined Apollon Smyrnis F.C. on a free transfer. His first goal for the club came through a header in a 3–4 home loss to AEK Athens F.C. on 13 December, and the following week his 36th-minute strike proved essential to the 1–0 win over Panetolikos FC.

Return home
Fernández returned to his homeland in June 2021, on a contract at FC Andorra in the newly created Primera División RFEF. He helped the club in their first-ever promotion to Segunda División during his first season, scoring 11 goals in 35 appearances (play-offs included).

On 29 December 2022, Andorra announced the transfer of Fernández to Gimnàstic de Tarragona in the third division.

References

External links

1990 births
Living people
People from Baix Llobregat
Sportspeople from the Province of Barcelona
Spanish footballers
Footballers from Catalonia
Association football wingers
La Liga players
Segunda División players
Segunda División B players
Tercera División players
Primera Federación players
UE Cornellà players
CE Sabadell FC footballers
CE Europa footballers
FC Cartagena footballers
RCD Mallorca B players
RCD Mallorca players
RCD Espanyol B footballers
UE Costa Brava players
UCAM Murcia CF players
FC Andorra players
Gimnàstic de Tarragona footballers
Israeli Premier League players
Bnei Sakhnin F.C. players
Super League Greece players
Asteras Tripolis F.C. players
Apollon Smyrnis F.C. players
Spanish expatriate footballers
Expatriate footballers in Israel
Expatriate footballers in Greece
Spanish expatriate sportspeople in Israel
Spanish expatriate sportspeople in Greece